The Indians Baseball Club is a baseball club that participates in the Greater Brisbane League competition and the Brisbane South competition. It is one of the original clubs in Australia and several clubs have been offshoots of it, including Redlands Baseball Club and the Carina Redsox.

The club does not have a very strong junior base, but was the 2007/2008 U16 Division 2 premiers with the help of ex-player Rory Rohweder. Also the same season, the Runcorn Major A team became Greater Brisbane League premiers after defeating the Redcliffe Padres 2-0 in a best of 3 final series.

Notable players
James Linger
Cooper Cronk - Rugby league for the Melbourne Storm, Queensland and Australia
Tristan Crawford - Minnesota Twins affiliates and Washington Nationals affiliates
Nathan Crawford - Laredo Broncos
Justin Erasmus - South Africa and Gulf Coast Red Sox

References

External links
Club Website
Tim Shaw at Indians Baseball Club Courier Mail Local TV
Tim Shaw toiling to make titles Courier Mail
Indians pitcher to follow brother 2008, 4 November. Logan West Leader

Australian baseball clubs
Sporting clubs in Brisbane
Baseball teams in Australia
Baseball teams established in 1982
1982 establishments in Australia
Greater Brisbane League